The Economy of Guangdong is one of the most prosperous in China. Guangdong is located in southern China, bordering on Fujian Province to the east, Hunan Province to the north, Guangxi Autonomous Region to the west and the special administrative regions of Hong Kong and Macau to the south. It is also the 1st economy of a sub-national entity in terms of GDP almost US$2.0 trillion (as of 2021) in all of Asia and 3rd largest sub-national entity in the world. 

In 2021, the gross regional product (GRP) is about $1.95 trillion, with its per capita GDP of 98,700 RMB ($15,570 in nominal and $ 23,598 in PPP). Guangdong has been the largest province by GDP since 1989 in Mainland China. In 2021, Guangdong's GDP was slightly larger than South Korea, the world's tenth largest economy. Guangdong's GDP by nominal is greater than the GDPs of all other BRICS states, except India. 

By Purchasing power parity (PPP) term, as of 2021, Guangdong's economy has a gross regional product (GRP) of $2.98 trillion, ranking between the United Kingdom and Italy with a GDP of $3.34 trillion and US$ $2.71 trillion respectively, the 10th and 11th largest in the world respectively.

Overview
This is a trend of official estimates of the gross domestic product of the Province of Guangdong:

After the communist revolution and until the start of the Deng Xiaoping reforms in 1978, Guangdong was an economic backwater, although a large underground, service-based economy has always existed. Economic development policies encouraged industrial development in the interior provinces which were weakly linked to Guangdong via transportation links. The government policy of economic autarky made Guangdong's access to the ocean irrelevant.

Deng Xiaoping's open door policy radically changed the economy of the province as it was able to take advantage of its access to the ocean, proximity to Hong Kong, and historical links to overseas Chinese. In addition, until the 1990s when the Chinese taxation system was reformed, the province benefited from the relatively low rate of taxation placed on it by the central government due to its post-Liberation status of being economically backward.

Although Shanghai is often cited as evidence of China's success, Guangdong's economic boom demonstrates that China has become a labor-intensive manufacturing economy. Guangdong's economic boom began with the early 1990s and has since spread to neighboring provinces, and also pulled their populations inward. Guangdong is China's largest exporter, as well as its largest importer of goods. Its extensive manufacturing base is largely privately owned, making it less reliant on fixed asset investments than other provinces in China.

The province is now one of the richest in the nation, with the highest GDP among all the provinces, although wage growth has only recently begun to rise due to a large influx of migrant workers from neighboring provinces. In 2021, Guangdong's per capita GDP was 98,700 RMB ($15,570 in nominal and $ 23,598 in PPP).

Guangdong contributes approximately 9% of the total national economic output. Now, it has three of the six Special Economic Zones: Shenzhen, Shantou and Zhuhai. The affluence of Guangdong, however, remains very much concentrated in a handful of cities near the Pearl River Delta.

Recently, more than 7000 factories based in southern Guangdong cities such as Shenzhen and Dongguan has shut due to rapidly falling demand from western consumers, stricter labour and environmental regulations and the global financial crisis.

Economic and Technological Development Zones
Da Yawan Economic and Technical Development Zone
 Foshan National New & Hi-Tech Industrial Development Zone (Chinese Version)
 Futian free-trade zone
 Guangzhou Development District
 Guangzhou Export Processing Zone
 Guangzhou Free Trade Zone
 Guangzhou Nansha Economic and Technical Development Zone
 Guangzhou Nanhu Lake Tourist Holiday Resort (Chinese Version)
 Guangzhou New & Hi-Tech Industrial Development Zone
 Huizhou Zhongkai National Hi-Tech Industrial Development Zone (Chinese Version)
 Shantou Free Trade Zone
 Shatoujiao Free Trade Zone
 Shenzhen Export Processing Zone
 Shenzhen Hi-Tech Industrial Park
 Yantian Port Free Trade Zone
 Zhanjiang Economic and Technological Development Zone (Chinese Version)
 Zhuhai National Hi-Tech Industrial Development Zone
 Zhuhai Free Trade Zone
 Zhongshan Torch High-tech Industrial Development Zone

References